Paranephelium spirei is an Asian tree species in the family Sapindaceae.  It can be found in Indo-China, Hainan island and peninsular Malaysia; no subspecies are listed in the Catalogue of Life.  In Viet Nam it may be called trường vải.

References

spirei
Flora of Indo-China